Elanus is a genus of bird of prey in the elanine kite subfamily. It was introduced by the French zoologist Jules-César Savigny in 1809 with the black-winged kite (Elanus caeruleus) as the type species. The name is from the Ancient Greek  for a "kite".

The genus contains four species:

The first three species above were considered conspecific as subspecies of Elanus caeruleus, which has been known as the black-shouldered kite.

These are white and grey raptors of open country, with black wing markings and a short square tail. They hunt by slowly quartering the habitat for rodents and other small mammals, birds and insects, sometimes hovering like a kestrel.

Notes

References

Ferguson-Lees, Christie, Franklin, Mead and Burton Raptors of the World  

 
Bird genera
Taxa named by Marie Jules César Savigny